Koy Sanjaq, also called Koye  is a town and district in Erbil Governorate in Kurdistan Region, Iraq.
In the town, there is a Chaldean Catholic church of Mar Yousif, constructed in 1923.

Etymology
The name of the town is derived from "köy" ("village" in Turkish) and "sanjaq" ("flag" in Turkish), and thus Koy Sanjaq translates to "village of the flag".

History
According to local tradition, Koy Sanjaq was founded by the son of an Ottoman sultan who planted his flag and established a garrison at the site of a seasonal bazaar after having defeated a rebellion at Baghdad, and developed into a town as locals moved to the settlement to provide services to the soldiers. A Jewish community at Koy Sanjaq is first mentioned in the late 18th century, by which time it was already well established. The community had its own graveyard, and spoke both Jewish Neo-Aramaic and Sorani Kurdish. A small Chaldean Catholic community was established in the town in the 19th century. In 1913, 200 Chaldean Catholics populated Koy Sanjaq, and were served by two priests and one functioning church as part of the archdiocese of Kirkuk.

The Iraqi census of 1947 recorded a total population of 8198 people, with 7746 Muslims, 268 Jews, and 184 Christians. 80-100 Jews from the village of Betwata took refuge in the town for several months in 1950, increasing the size of the local community to 350-400 people, so to accompany the Jews of Koy Sanjaq when they emigrated to Israel in the following year. Koy Sanjaq had a population of 10,379 in 1965. The town was struck by Iranian airstrikes targeting the Kurdistan Democratic Party (KDP) base on 10 November 1994, resulting in the death of a civilian, and wounded three KDP militants. In 1999, Assyrians from the nearby village of Armota protested the construction of a mosque in their village at Koy Sanjaq. Koya University was established in 2003.

35 displaced Assyrian families from Mosul were housed in a converted church building in the town in November 2014, and had not been rehoused as of April 2015. As of March 2018, 60 Assyrian families inhabit Koy Sanjaq. The Assyrian population largely speak Kurdish, but some continue to speak Syriac. An Iranian missile attack on the Democratic Party of Iranian Kurdistan headquarters in the town on 8 September 2018 killed 14 people.

Notable people
 Haji Qadir Koyi (1817-1897), Kurdish poet
 Dildar (1918-1948), Kurdish poet
 Tahir Tewfiq (1922–1987), Kurdish musician
 Fuad Masum (b. 1938), Kurdish politician and President of Iraq (2014-2018)
 Rounak Abdulwahid Mustafa (b. 1942) First Lady of Iraq (2014-2018), wife of Fuad Masum 
 Aras Koyi (b. 1972), Kurdish musician

See also 

 Şêxbizin (tribe)

References
Notes

Citations

Bibliography
 
 
 

 
Cities in Iraqi Kurdistan
Populated places in Erbil Governorate
Kurdish settlements in Erbil Governorate
Assyrian communities in Iraq
Historic Jewish communities in Iraq